Fismes is a commune in the Marne department in the Grand Est region of north-eastern France.

The inhabitants of the commune are known as Fismois or Fismoises

The commune has been awarded three flowers in the Competition of cities and villages in Bloom.

Geography 
Fismes is located 25 km west by northwest of Reims and some 12 km east by southeast of Braine. Access is by National Highway N31 from Reims through the heart of the commune and the town and continuing west to Soissons. There is also the D967 road from Longueval-Barbonval in the north to the town and continuing southwest to Chery-Chartreuve. There is also the D386 going south from the village to Saint-Gilles. Apart from Fismes there are three hamlets: Fismette and Baslieux are continuations of the urban area of Fismes while Villette is in the east of the commune. Fismes station has rail connections to Reims.

The Vesle river flows through the commune from east to west with the Ruisseau du Moulin and the Ruisseau Saint-Marie flow from the north into the Vesle. The Ardre river flows from the south to join the Vesle west of the town.

Neighbouring communes and villages

History

Antiquity 
Fismes, on the right bank of the Vesle, developed from a Gallic ancient town named, during the Gallo-Roman era, "Ad Fines Suessionum" (limit of the Suessiones' territory) or "Ad Fines Remorum" (limit of the Remi's territory), as the city was situated on the boundary of the two Gallic tribes Suessiones and Remi.

As Charles Rostaing indicates, the Latin word "fines" is a translation from the Gallic toponym equoranda which means "boundary" or "limit".

Middle Ages 
The barbaric period did not spare Fismes. During the first half of the Middle Ages, the Normands and the Hungarians, destroyed the city of Fismes multiple times. These ravages pushed the agglomeration of the city towards the heights of the Vesle's right bank.

In 1226 Thibault IV, the Chansonnier (songwriter), helped Fismes become a free city, thanks to hard work of natives that participated in the war led by Thibault. By a charter and a seal that bears the emblem of the commune and under the aegis of a mayor and two deputies, Fismes became autonomous. Thus, the village was able to develop its artisanship, businesses, festivals and markets.

The walls of the city continued to expand; a church of stone, a château which occupied the current plaza of the post office and would one day house as governor, the poet Eustache Deschamps, as well as the City Hall, that continues to occupy the same place, were all constructed in this formative epoch.

The Hundred Years War between the English and the French brought, once again, the city of Fismes to ruins. Later the religious wars and the Fronde completely destroyed the walls of the city and the chateau of Fismes.

Modern Era 
From Louis XIII to Charles X almost all the future Kings of France passed through Fismes which was their last stop on the way to their coronation at the Cathedral of Reims.

In 1646, Louis II de Bourbon acquired the manorial rights to Fismes and bestowed them on César de Costentin de Tourville for his good services to the King. In 1647, the land was passed on to the eldest son of Cesar, François-Cesar.

During the Fronde, the ramparts of the city and the chateau were completely destroyed.

After the revolution, a time of much inner conflict among the people of Fismes, Napoleon came to Fismes in order to sign two important declarations. Following Napoleon and the French Revolution, 30,000 Prussians arrived in Fismes and, once again, plundered the village.

In the 19th century, France experienced the rapidly expanding industrial revolution. Sugar beet, porcelain of Fismes (which was rare and expensive), the foundry, the railway, hat making, tanneries and mills mark the advancements of the region and the economic history of this century.

The 20th century began in worse conditions than the preceding finished. Fismes was greatly affected by the First World War. The Germans invaded the city, then remained on the Chemin des Dames before they completely demolished the city in 1918.

Fismes attempted to reconstruct itself slowly. Unfortunately, due to its position as a railway town through which passed trains filled with deportees being sent to Germany, the city suffered during the course of the Second World War. 14 residents of Fismes, who were seized for acts of resistance, died in Nazi concentration camps. Among them was the mayor of Fismes, Doctor Genillon.

Heraldry

Administration

Administrative situation
The town has been the capital of the Canton of Fismes since its inception during the French Revolution. It belongs to the arrondissement of Reims (district of Reims until 1801).

Fismes is part of the Communauté urbaine du Grand Reims.

List of Successive Mayors

Mayors from 1937

Demography
In 2017 the commune had 5,487 inhabitants.

Economy

The local economy was dominated by the presence of a sugar factory which ceased operations in 1978. The activity of light metalworking has also been present for a long time.

Since 2008 the commune of Fismes has been integrated into the production zone for Champagne. The parcels of land authorized for planting vineyards are not yet known.

The main business enterprises are Campa (manufacturing premium electric heaters), Finaxo (methods for water treatment and waste), Profinox, Fimaluplast (Aluminium Joinery and PVC), and Experton-Revollier (wire mesh surfaces); a family group recently took over the Ghent company.

Culture and heritage

Civil heritage
The commune has a number of buildings and structures that are registered as historical monuments:
The Laplanche Foundry (19th century)
The Ets Déodat Fancy Goods Factory (20th century)
The Ets Beucher Wire Works (20th century)
The Goumant Sugar Refinery (20th century)
The War Memorial (20th century) This First World War memorial was sculpted by François Mourgues with the help of architect Edward Veis and marbler Mr. Renaud
The Ets Gantois Wire Works (20th century)
The Roland Flour Mill (20th century)

Other sites of interest
The Town Hall
The Town ramparts
The Royal Milestones on the route to Soissons which was the route to the coronation
Heurtevin House where the kings of France often spent their last night as prince;
The American Memorial Bridge in honour of the 28th Infantry division from Pennsylvania;
The Bread Museum

Religious heritage

The Church of Saint Macre (12th century) is registered as an historical monument.
The Pillar of the door on Saint Gilles;

Picture Gallery

Fismes Memorial '18
The Fismes Memorial site is located along the Vesle river, near the memorial bridge that was constructed with the help of the State of Pennsylvania.

The Battle of Fismes and Fismette that occurred during World War I sparked a lasting friendship between the City of Fismes and the United States, particularly Pennsylvania. This bloody battle took place from August 3 to September 1, 1918 and was the last major German attack on the Allies during World War I. The 32nd American Division lost 2,000 men during its first attempt to cross the Vesle and attack the Germans. The 28th American Infantry Division, consisting of soldiers mostly from Pennsylvania, replaced the former division, forced the Germans to retreat, and proceeded to liberate Fismes.

As a result of the aid Fismes received from the American armies during World War I, the city constructed a memorial to honor the lives of the men in the 28th American Infantry Division. The main intentions of this memorial are to commemorate the soldiers' sacrifices and strengthen the ties that exist between Fismes and the United States, specifically Pennsylvania. The memorial site is the result of a collaboration of the City of Fismes  with the Fismes Office of Tourism and the Association of Leisure and Recreation Services.

The memorial consists of informational plaques and a set of sculptures from renowned artist Christian Lapie. Christian Lapie

The memorial was officially inaugurated on September 15, 2018. The mayor of Meadville, Pennsylvania, one of Fismes' sister cities, was present at the ceremony along with Meadville government and community members. Fismes' sister cities of Triuggio, Italy and Bad Oeynhausen, Germany were represented as well.

Notable people linked to the commune
Athanase Coquerel (1820-1875), theologian
Félix Billet
Camille Auguste Mercier (1848-1881), scholar
Sophie Manéglier (1803-1892), writer
Albert Uderzo, French cartoonist and co-creator of Astérix, born in Fismes.
César de Costentin de Tourville (died in 1647), Count of Fismes, military officer, father of Marshall Anne-Hilarion de Tourville, vice-admiral of France.

Twinning
Fismes is twinned with:
 Wem, England
 Bad Oeynhausen, Germany

See also 
 Communes of the Marne department

References

External links

Fismes official website 
Office of Tourism and Museums of Fismes 
Fifmes on the 1750 Cassini Map

Communes of Marne (department)